

World's largest EV battery manufacturers

List

See also
Electric vehicle battery
List of production battery electric vehicles

References

External links
List of Electric Vehicle Battery Manufacturers  February 2010

 
Battery man
Lists of manufacturers
Technology-related lists